Khatm-e-Nabuwat Chowk, also spelled as Khatam-e-Nabuwat Chowk, previously known as Tehsil Chowk Chiniot,, is a famous square and landmark in Chiniot. It is also an intersection between roads connecting main cities of Pakistan.

See also 
Khatam an-Nabiyyin

References 

Chiniot District
Squares in Pakistan
Road junctions in Pakistan